Riasne is a village in Horlivka municipality of Donetsk Oblast of eastern Ukraine, at 36.1 km NE from the centre of Donetsk city. Riasne is the southernmost part of Horlivka municipality.

Demographics
Native language as of the Ukrainian Census of 2001:
Ukrainian 66.67%
Russian 33.33%

References

Villages in Horlivka Raion